Gorong'a is a ward in Tarime District, Mara Region of northern Tanzania, East Africa. In 2016 the Tanzania National Bureau of Statistics report there were 12,206 people in the ward, from 11,062 in 2012.

Villages / neighborhoods 
The ward has 4 villages and 20 hamlets.

 Kitawasi
 Gibasisi
 Kitawasi Senta
 Moharango
 Nyabori
 Remarera
 Masurura
 Kemoseti
 Keweirumbe
 Masurura
 Nyaichirichiri
 Nyantare
 Masanga
 Kemangari
 Kemosahe
 Kwigori
 Masanga Senta
 Nyamerama Senta
 Tigite
 Kenyamosabi
 Kenyamosabi
 Kioboke
 Ngonche
 Nyamagongwe

References

Tarime District
Mara Region